Sir Matthew Richard Sausse or Sause (1809 – 5 November 1867) was an Irish barrister who was the last Chief Justice of the Supreme Court of Bombay and the first  Chief Justice of the Bombay High Court.

Career
Sausse was born in Carrick-on-Suir, County Tipperary into a Roman Catholic family. He was the son of Richard Sausse and Jane Duffey. His brother Sir Richard Frederick (known in Spanish as Ricardo Federico de La Saussaye y Duffey) was governor of Cartagena, Spain. Sausse graduated with distinction from Trinity College, Dublin.

He first worked  as the Secretary and Solicitor in the Commission to Enquire into the state of the Municipal Corporation of England. Richard Sausse became the Chief Justice of The Supreme Court of Bombay Presidency in 1859, thereafter on 23 June 1862 he was appointed the Chief Justice of the Bombay High Court and served there till 1866. He was known as "Sausse the Silent" in the Court.

Sausse married Charlotte Henrietta.

He died of gastric fever at Killarney House, seat of Lord Castlerosse.

References

1809 births
1867 deaths
People from County Tipperary
Alumni of Trinity College Dublin
Irish barristers
Knights Bachelor
British India judges
Chief Justices of the Bombay High Court
Date of birth missing